Danny Nadeau (born May 15, 1965) is an American politician serving in the Minnesota House of Representatives since 2023. A member of the Republican Party of Minnesota, Nadeau represents District 34A in the northwest Twin Cities metropolitan area, which includes the cities of Champlin and Rogers and parts of Hennepin and Wright Counties in Minnesota.

Early life, education and career 
While a native of Medina, Minnesota, Nadeau has lived in Rogers for over two decades. He worked as Hassan Township administrator and served on the park board there.

In 2008, Nadeau worked at the Minnesota House of Representatives in the House Republican Research department. From 2009 to 2010, he worked as a program manager at the State Energy Office at the Minnesota Department of Commerce. Nadeau worked as assistant to Hennepin County Commissioner Jeff Johnson for 12 years prior to his election to the legislature.

Minnesota House of Representatives 
Nadeau was first elected to the Minnesota House of Representatives in 2022, following redistricting and the retirement of Republican incumbents Eric Lucero and Jerry Hertaus. Nadeau serves on the Health Finance and Policy and State and Local Government Finance and Policy Committees.

Electoral history

Personal life 
Nadeau lives in Rogers, Minnesota, and has two children.

References

External links

Republican Party members of the Minnesota House of Representatives
1965 births
Living people